Cristina Branco (born 28 December 1972 in Almeirim, Ribatejo, Portugal) is a Portuguese musician. She was drawn to jazz and styles of Portuguese music before settling on fado, a choice made after being introduced to the music of Amália Rodrigues by her grandfather. Branco then studied the poems from which the major fado lyrics are taken. Branco performs accompanied by composer Custódio Castelo on guitar.

Personal life
Cristina Branco was married to Tiago Salazar with whom she has two daughters. Cristina Branco became an expat in the Netherlands while she was building a career as a fado singer. The couple endured a complex litigation process with the Portuguese tax office and moved their tax address to the Netherlands in order to take advantage of the favorable tax environment there. The couple got divorced in 2018. She has been linked to the Portuguese Communist Party since an early age and performed in the party's festival Festa do Avante.

On December 5, 2020, Branco was involved and injured on a car accident that was extensively covered by the Portuguese media. This accident occurred on A1 highway, near Cartaxo, which ultimately killed singer Sara Carreira, daughter of Tony Carreira, and also injured singer and actor Ivo Lucas.

Discography 
 Cristina Branco in Holland (1998)
 Murmúrios (1998)
 Post-Scriptum (2000)
 O Descobridor: Cristina Branco canta Slauerhoff (2000)
 Corpo Iluminado (2001)
 Sensus (2003)
 Ulisses (2005)
 Live (2006)
 Abril (2007)
 Kronos (2009)
 Não há só tangos em Paris (2011)
 Alegria (2013)
 Menina (2016)
 Branco (2018)
 Eva (2020)

External links 
 Agency web page

References 

1972 births
Living people
People from Almeirim
Portuguese fado singers
21st-century Portuguese women singers
EmArcy Records artists
Decca Records artists